Mount Samaria State Park is a  park situated approximately 20 km north of Mansfield in the state of Victoria, Australia. 
The park is bounded on the western side by the Broken River and Lake Nillahcootie.

See also
 Protected areas of Victoria (Australia)

References 

State parks of Victoria (Australia)
Protected areas established in 1979
Parks of Hume (region)